was a Japanese novelist and critic.

Wada was born in Oshamambe, Hokkaidō, and graduated from Chuo University with a law degree. In addition to his novels in the naturalist tradition, he edited the diaries of Ichiyō Higuchi and Fumiko Hayashi.

Selected works 
 Higuchi Ichiyō, Chikuma Shobō, 1954
 Hayashi Fumiko, Chikuma Shobō, 1961
 Aijō no kiroku, Chikuma Shobō, 1969
 Ichiyō tanjō, Gendai Shokan, 1969

References

External links
 OpenLibrary entries

Japanese writers
1906 births
1977 deaths
Writers from Hokkaido
Chuo University alumni
Naoki Prize winners
Yomiuri Prize winners